The 1912 South Sydney season was the 5th in the club's history. The club competed in the New South Wales Rugby Football League Premiership (NSWRFL), finishing the season 4th and missing the finals for the first time in club history. Souths also competed in the inaugural season of the post season tournament, the City Cup. The competition culminated with Souths defeating Glebe in the final.

Ladder

Fixtures

Regular season (NSWRFL)

City Cup

Statistics

References

South Sydney Rabbitohs seasons
South Sydney season